SALEM-Immanuel Lutheran College (ILC) is a Hong Kong Aided Co-educational Christian Secondary School with primary and secondary sessions, founded in 1983. The college serves both boys and girls. The campus is now located in Tai Yuen Estate, Tai Po, New Territories.

History 
The predecessor of Immanuel Lutheran College was Immanuel Lutheran English Middle School, which was run by the South Asian Lutheran Evangelical Mission inside a private mansion in Kwun Tong, Kowloon. It was small and facilities were inadequate. Nevertheless, the enthusiasm and dedication of teachers deeply impressed parents and the Education Department. In 1978, it was asked to become a caput school and before long, it was further invited to become an aided school. The transition was completed in 1982. 

However, due to limitations of the school building, the learning environment and facilities could hardly be upgraded to the level of a standard aided secondary school. In order to improve the situation, South Asian Lutheran Evangelical Mission was advised by the Education Department to phase out Immanuel Lutheran English Middle School and start a new school in the New Territories. Eventually, Immanuel Lutheran College was established in 1983.

In the first year, ILC had only S.1 and S.4 but it developed gradually to become a full secondary school with all levels from S.1 to S.7 in the following years.

There have been many improvements in the campus environment and teaching facilities over the years. From the 1996 summer to the fall of 1997, a large scale school improvement construction project was carried out to put up a new wing at the main entrance. When it was completed, more rooms were made available for various activities and the working conditions for teachers had also been made better. Furthermore, in order to catch up with the fast growth of information technology, a computer network system was installed to connect all computers in the school, and multi-media projectors were installed in every classroom and special room. A wireless local area network (WLAN) was set up, too. Teachers and students could then enjoy this information technology freely on the school campus. There are now two Multimedia Language Centres, two Computer Rooms, one Multimedia Production Centre, and one Multimedia Studio (the WoW Production Studio) in the school.

In the aspect of student growth, the school is still aiming at fostering their all-rounded development in their intellectual, social, physical and spiritual dimensions. As a development of students’ capacities and abilities, a Student Union was established in 1991 and in 1995, four houses, Samuel, Enoch, Esther, and Deborah were also set up. Through their participations, students have opportunities to plan programmes and run activities on their own. In the process, they can cultivate their potentials in various aspects and experience gained would be most precious to them.

School mission 
The college devotes to the provision of a quality education in a Christian context and a healthy environment where students can develop their potential, excel intellectually, physically, socially, and spiritually, and prepare themselves for the challenges in life.

School motto 
Wisdom, Truth, Virtue, Love to all - 博學明道，臻善益群

Symbolisation of the school logo 
The cross at the top represents the school's Christian background; the grid (fish net) and the pearl at the centre symbolises Tai Po at its early stages; the source of book, with pages printed Greek alphabets Alpha and Omega, can be derived from a Biblical scripture: "I (the God) am the Alpha and the Omega, the beginning and the end." (first part of Revelation of John, 21:6), and also indicates the thought of Christian education.

Principal 

List of ILC principals:

Class Structure 

SALEM-Immanuel Lutheran College employs English as the main medium of instruction. Subjects that offer to Junior and Senior student are listed in below.

Junior-Form Curriculum - Chinese Language, English Language, Mathematics, Christian Ethics, Liberal Studies, Putonghua, Chinese History, World History, Physics, Chemistry, Biology, Integrated Science, Geography, Physical Education, Home Economics, Design & Applied Technology, Visual Arts, Music, Computer Literacy, Introduction to Economics ,Business, Accounting & Financial Studies

Senior-Form Curriculum -

To meet students’ needs, multiple subject combinations are offered to students to choose from based on their own interests and abilities. After the classification of classes in secondary four, students are allowed to drop the elective(s) before the starts of secondary five and six.

Student life 
Upon the enrolment day, freshman for ILC are divided into four houses, Samuel, Enoch, Esther and Deborah, which are famous names that appear in the Old Testament. Students are encouraged to engage in different houses' activities in order to strengthen their social skills and inspire their potentials.

External links
School Web

Educational institutions established in 1983
Secondary schools in Hong Kong
Lutheran universities and colleges
Tai Po
1983 establishments in Hong Kong